Improvement district may refer to:

Business improvement district, a type of urban zoning
Improvement districts of Alberta, a type of rural municipality
Tourism improvement district, a type of urban zoning

See also